The Painted eel (Echelus myrus) is an eel in the family Ophichthidae (worm/snake eels). It was described by Carl Linnaeus in 1758, originally under the genus Muraena. It is a marine, subtropical eel which is known from the eastern Atlantic Ocean, including the Bay of Biscay, the Republic of Congo, and the Mediterranean.

The Painted eel is of minor commercial interest to fisheries. It has been recorded spawning in the Bay of Algiers during the months of August and September.

References

Ophichthidae
Fish described in 1758
Taxa named by Carl Linnaeus